Pratibha Dhanorkar is an Indian politician from Maharashtra and a member of the Indian National Congress. She was elected as a member of the Legislative Assembly of Maharashtra from Warora.

References

Indian National Congress politicians from Maharashtra
Living people
Year of birth missing (living people)